Down Home is a studio album by American country artist, Melba Montgomery. It was released in August 1964 via United Artists Records and contained 11 tracks. It was the third studio disc released in Montgomery's recording career and her second as a solo artist. Many of the album's tracks were penned by Montgomery herself. Two of its singles reached charting positions on the American country songs chart. It received a positive review from Billboard magazine in 1964.

Background
Melba Montgomery rose to commercial success as a duet pairing with George Jones. Their recording of her composition, "We Must Have Been Out of Our Minds", was a top three single on the country charts in 1963. Over the next several years, the Jones-Montgomery pairing would record a series of albums and singles. She also appeared as a solo artist during the sixties decade, with albums and singles of her own.

Recording and content
Down Home was Montgomery's second solo album in her recording career. The disc was produced by Pappy Daily in sessions held between January and September 1963. The sessions were held at the Columbia Studio, located in Nashville, Tennessee. The album contained a total of 12 tracks. Seven of the album's songs were composed by Montgomery herself. Among them was the Jones-Montgomery duet, "We Must Have Been Out of Our Minds" (first released on the album What's in Our Hearts). Three selections were co-written with her brother, Carl Montgomery: "Lies Can't Hide What's on My Mind", "What's Bad for You Is Good for Me" and "Don't Make Me Build Another Wall".

Release, reception and singles

Down Home was released in August 1964 on United Artists Records. It was distributed as a vinyl LP, with six songs on either side of the record. Billboard named it among its album "Special Merit"s when reviewing it. "There are few gals who can warble a country tune like Melba Montgomery, and this album is ample proof why her popularity is growing among country fans," the magazine wrote. AllMusic rated the album three out of five stars. 

Three singles were included on the disc. Two of these singles reached charting positions. "Hall of Shame" (released in March 1963) reached number 22 on the American Billboard Hot Country Songs chart. "The Greatest One of All" (released in October 1963) reached number 26 on the Billboard country chart. The songs were Montgomery's first solo entries on the Billboard country songs chart and her highest-peaking solo entries until 1974's "No Charge". "The Face" was first issued as a single in March 1964.

Track listing

Release history

References

1964 albums
Albums produced by Pappy Daily
Melba Montgomery albums
United Artists Records albums